Gaspare Paluzzi degli Albertoni (1566–1614) was a Roman Catholic prelate who served as Bishop of Sant'Angelo dei Lombardi e Bisaccia (1601–1614) and Apostolic Collector to Portugal (1609–1614).

Biography
Gaspare Paluzzi degli Albertoni was born in Rome in 1566.
On 4 April 1601, he was appointed during the papacy of Pope Clement VIII as Bishop of Sant'Angelo dei Lombardi e Bisaccia.
On 31 January 1609, he was appointed during the papacy of Pope Paul V as Apostolic Collector to Portugal.
He served as Bishop of Sant'Angelo dei Lombardi e Bisaccia until his death in 1614.

Episcopal succession
While bishop, he was the principal consecrator of:
Rui Pires da Veiga, Bishop of Elvas (1613);

and the principal co-consecrator of:
Giovanni Garzia Mellini, Titular Archbishop of Colossae (1605); and 
Paolo Emilio Sammarco, Bishop of Umbriatico (1609).

References

External links and additional sources
 (for Chronology of Bishops) 
 (for Chronology of Bishops) 

17th-century Italian Roman Catholic bishops
Bishops appointed by Pope Clement VIII
Bishops appointed by Pope Paul V
1566 births
1614 deaths
Archbishops of Sant'Angelo dei Lombardi-Conza-Nusco-Bisaccia